Morin is a yellow chemical compound that can be isolated from Maclura pomifera (Osage orange), Maclura tinctoria (old fustic), and from leaves of Psidium guajava (common guava). In a preclinical in vitro study, morin was found to be a weak inhibitor of fatty acid synthase with an IC50 of 2.33 μM.  Morin was also found to inhibit amyloid formation by islet amyloid polypeptide (or amylin) and disaggregate amyloid fibers.

Morin exhibit inhibitory action against IgE-mediated allergic response.  Morin treatment significantly down-regulated expressions of BLT2, NF-κB, and Th2-cytokine (TNF-α, IL-1β, IL-4, IL-6, and IL-13) in lungs of murine model of allergic asthma.

Morin can be used to test for the presence of aluminium or tin in a solution, since it forms characteristically fluorescent coordination complexes with them.

Glycosides 
 Morin-3-O-arabinoside
 Morin-3-O-lyxoside

References 

Flavonols